The FIS Alpine World Ski Championships 1932 were held 4–6 February in Cortina d'Ampezzo, Italy, the second edition of the FIS Alpine World Ski Championships alpine skiing competition and organized by the International Ski Federation (FIS). The combined event was added to the program.

Alpine skiing was not yet a part of the Winter Olympics in 1932, held 4–15 February in Lake Placid, New York; it was added to the Olympic program in 1936 in Garmisch-Partenkirchen, Germany.

Men's events

Women's events

Medal table

See also
 Italy at the FIS Alpine World Ski Championships 1932

References

External links
FIS-Ski.com – Alpine skiing – 1932 World Championships

 
1932 in alpine skiing
1932 in Italian sport
1932
Sport in Cortina d'Ampezzo
International sports competitions hosted by Italy
Alpine skiing competitions in Italy
February 1932 sports events